Hofmeisteria is a genus of Mexican flowering plants in the family Asteraceae.

 Species
 Hofmeisteria crassifolia S.Watson - Sonora
 Hofmeisteria dissecta (Hook. & Arn.) R.M.King & H.Rob. - Jalisco, Colima, Guerrero, México State, Sinaloa, Nayarit
 Hofmeisteria fasciculata (Benth.) Walp. - Baja California, Baja California Sur, Sonora
 Hofmeisteria filifolia I.M.Johnst. - Baja California, Baja California Sur
 Hofmeisteria gayleana B.L.Turner - Durango, Sinaloa
 Hofmeisteria malvaefolia (B.L.Rob. & Greenm.) B.L.Turner - Oaxaca
 Hofmeisteria mexiae (B.L.Rob.) B.L.Turner - Jalisco, Nayarit
 Hofmeisteria schaffneri (A.Gray) R.M.King & H.Rob. - Guanajuato, Jalisco, San Luis Potosí
 Hofmeisteria sinaloensis Gentry - Sinaloa
 Hofmeisteria standleyi (S.F.Blake) R.M.King & H.Rob. - Sinaloa, Sonora
 Hofmeisteria urenifolia (Hook. & Arn.) Walp. - Chiapas, Oaxaca, Guerrero, Michoacán, Colima, Jalisco, Nayarit

References

Asteraceae genera
Eupatorieae
Endemic flora of Mexico